Vilmarie Mojica (born August 13, 1985, in Toa Baja, Puerto Rico) is a volleyball player from Puerto Rico, who captained the Women's National Team at the 2008 Olympic Qualification Tournament in Japan. There the team ended up in eighth and last place, having received a wild card for the event after Peru and Kenya withdrew.

Career
She participated at the 2002 FIVB Volleyball Women's World Championship in Germany.
Mojica was named Best Setter at the 2007 NORCECA Championship, where her team finished in fifth place in  final rankings.
She participated at the 2010 FIVB Volleyball Women's World Championship.

Awards

Individuals
 2007 NORCECA Championship "Best Setter"
 2009 Pan-American Cup "Best Setter"
 2009 NORCECA Championship "Best Setter"
 2012 Summer Olympics NORCECA qualification tournament's "Best Setter"

References

External links
 FIVB Profile

1985 births
Living people
People from Toa Baja, Puerto Rico
Puerto Rican women's volleyball players
Volleyball players at the 2007 Pan American Games
Volleyball players at the 2015 Pan American Games
Pan American Games competitors for Puerto Rico
Volleyball players at the 2016 Summer Olympics
Central American and Caribbean Games silver medalists for Puerto Rico
Central American and Caribbean Games bronze medalists for Puerto Rico
Competitors at the 2006 Central American and Caribbean Games
Competitors at the 2010 Central American and Caribbean Games
Competitors at the 2014 Central American and Caribbean Games
Setters (volleyball)
Summer Olympics competitors for Puerto Rico
Central American and Caribbean Games medalists in volleyball
21st-century Puerto Rican women